This is a list of Italian and Italian-American superheroes and villains.

Heroes
 The Punisher or Francis "Frank" Castiglione (later shortened to Castle), Marvel
Valentina Allegra de Fontaine, Marvel
 Amok
 Argent, DC
 Argoman (Come rubare la corona d'Inghilterra, 1967)
 Asso di Picche / Ace of Spades (Albi Uragano magazine, 1945)
 Atlas (Created by Luigi Grecchi and Loredano Ugolini, 1960)
 Atoman (alien-human hybrid, Italian comic)
 Atomik (Created by Luciano Secchi and Paolo Piffarerio, 1962)
 Balance / Debora Crovi (member of Gemini, Marvel Italia)
 Barbel
Scorpion (Carmilla Black), Marvel
Blue Shield, aka Joseph Cartelli, Marvel
 Brendon
 Captain Hot Wheels (Magic Boy / Mattel Italia)
 Capitan Italia (The X-Team, Flag fanzine, 1994)
 Ciclone (a.k.a. l’uomo atomico / the Atomic Man, created by Andrea Lavezzolo and Carlo Cossio, 1945)
 The Darkness / Jackie Estacado (Image / Top Cow)
 Dryad (Callie Betto), Marvel
 Enzo Ceccotti / Jeeg Robot (They Call Me Jeeg)
 Euroforce (Marvel Italia)
 Ezio Auditore da Firenze (Assassin's Creed)
 Fascinax
 Flashman
 Front / Gabriel Caine (member of Gemini, Marvel Italia)
 Gemini (Marvel Italia)
 Giorno Giovanna (JoJo Bizarre Adventures)
 Goldface (Goldface, the Fantastic Superman, 1967)
 Grip / Brandon Blake (member of Gemini, Marvel Italia)
 The Huntress or Helena Rosa Bertinelli, DC
 Il Massacratore (ally of Captain Italia, Flag fanzine)
 There is a strong possibility that the mainstream Iron Man may have Italian heritage. It is speculated Anthony Stark may be half Italian on his mother's side. His mother's maiden name, Carbonell, is likely a shortened, Americanized, or dialectal version of the common Italian surname Carbonelli or Carbonello. Another possibility is that Carbonell is a Catalan surname. (Marvel)
 Ultimate Iron Man (character), Antonio Stark, is Italian on his mother's side, with his mother's surname being Cerrera.
 Italian Spiderman
 Jason Lee Scott; the original Red Power Ranger on Mighty Morphin Power Rangers
 Junior (Intrepido, 1960)
 Lancelot (S.H.I.E.L.D. agent, member of Gemini, Marvel Italia)
 Lazarus Ledd (Italian comic)
 Lost Kidz
 l'Ombra / The Shadow (Created by Alfredo Castelli and Fernando Tacconi, 1974)
 L’Uomo Blindato / The Armoured Man
 Mad Dog Rassitano Member of Code Blue in Marvel Comics
 Magic Patrol
 Makabar
 Dino Manelli, Marvel
 Marino, il ragazzo degli abissi / Marino, the Boy of the Abysses
 Marstorius from Fighter's History
 Maskar
 Medioman (Mai Dire Grande Fratello TV series, 2001)
 Medium
 Michele Silenzi (The Invisible Boy)
 Mirko (Created by Vittorio Cossio and Carlo Cossio, 1947)
 Missy Talia
 Misterix (Le Più Belle Avventure, 1946)
 Mistero / Mystery (Drama sul Mare, 1946)
 Omerta AKA Paul "Paulie" Provenzano (Marvel)
 Claire Bennet on TV series Heroes
 Nathan Petrelli on TV series Heroes
 Peter Petrelli on TV series Heroes
 Sara Pezzini, wielder of the Witchblade, Image / Top Cow
 Pizza-Man
 Plutos (Created by Gian Luigi Bonelli and Leone Cimpellin, 1949)
 Pumaman (L'Uomo puma / Pumaman, ADR Films 1980)
 Radar (alien, Italian comic)
 Ramarro (Tempi Supplementari, 1986)
 Rat-Man, Panini Comics, formerly Marvel Italia
 Razzo, L’Uomo di Plastica / Rocket, the Man of Plastic (alien w/ Italian name, La Setta, May 1948)
 Roal, Il Tarzan del mare / Roal, the Tarzan of the Seas
 Rockslide AKA Santo Vaccarro, an Italian American (Marvel)
 Rose from Street Fighter
 Simbolo / Symbol (Troglo Comics Ltd. and Factory, 1998)
 Slim, il ragazzo d'acciaio / Slim, the Steel Boy
 Dave Speed (Super Fuzz, 1980)
 Strong Guy or Guido Carosella
 Suede / Nicholas Blake (member of Gemini, Marvel Italia)
 Superargo (Superargo Versus Diabolicus, 1966)
 Supersonic Man (Spanish/Italian movie, 1979)
 Super Mario
 Super Women (Italian comic character, created by Clelia Ferrario and Renato Frascoli, 1966)
 Tanks L'uomo D'Acciaio / Tanks the Steel Man
 The Three Fantastic Supermen
 Tiramolla
 Tom Clerc (Sign Gene, Pluin)
 Video Boy (Magic Boy / Mattel Italia)
 Voldo from Soulcalibur
 Vulcano Rosso from Street Fighter
 WitchBlade (Sara Pezzini)
 Yorga (Cow Boy weekly comic journal, 1945)
 Zakimort
 Zatanna, aka Zantana Zatara, daughter of Giovanni Zatara, DC
 Giovanni Zatara, DC
 Zachary Zatara, DC

Villains
 Blacklash, Marc Scarlotti, Marvel
 The Bertinelli crime family from the Batman comic book series, DC
 Blackwing, or Joseph Manfredi, Marvel
(Note: There is a possibility that Catwoman / Selina Kyle is the daughter of Carmine Falcone, an Italian-American crime boss. It has not been confirmed, but has been hinted at in Batman: Dark Victory and Catwoman: When in Rome. DC)
 Alphonse "Big Boy" Caprice
 The Costa crime family from the Punisher comic book series, Marvel
 Count Nefaria or Count Luchino Nefaria, Marvel
 Alberto Falcone (DC)
 Carmine Falcone (DC)
 Diabolik, created by Angela & Luciana Giussani in 1962
 Diavolo
 Don Fortunato (Marvel)
 Franchetti Family (Image / Top Cow)
 Frankie Franchetti (Jackie's adopted father, killed by The Darkness, Image / Top Cow)
 Gommaflex created by Bunker and Piffarerio.
 The Gnucci crime family from the Punisher comic book series, Marvel
 Paulie Franchetti (Jackie's cousin, killed by the Darkness, Image / Top Cow)
 Jigsaw or Billy Russo, Marvel
 Jimmy-6, Giacomo Fortunato, Marvel
 Jux Clerc (Sign Gene, Pluin)
 Killing
 Kriminal
Madame Masque, Marvel
The Maggia organized crime group, Marvel
Magica De Spell
The Magliozzi Crime Family from the Sin City comic book series, Darkhorse
Ma Gnucci, head of the Gnucci family, Marvel
Sal Maroni and the Maroni crime family, DC
The Millefiore Family, an organized crime group in the manga Reborn!
 Satanik, created by Max Bunker & Magnus in 1964
 Monica Rappaccini, Marvel
 Silvermane, or Silvio Manfredi, Marvel
 Sylar on television series Heroes
 Superciuk
 Unus the Untouchable, Marvel
 Vengeance, or Michael Badilino, Marvel
 Venom, a.k.a. Angelo Fortunato, the second Venom and son of Maggia boss Don Fortunato, Marvel
X-Cutioner, Carl Denti, Marvel
Tony Zucco, DC

References

External links
Internationalhero (Superheroes from around the World)

Italian
Italian superheroes
Italian
Superheroes
Superheroes